The Eiger Glacier is a glacier situated on the north-west side of the Eiger in the Bernese Alps of Switzerland. The glacier is within the municipality of Lauterbrunnen in the canton of Bern.

By 2005 its length had reduced to 2.5 km.

See also
List of glaciers in Switzerland
Swiss Alps

References

External links

Eigergletscher page from the Swiss glacier monitoring network

Glaciers of the canton of Bern
Glaciers of the Alps